The Sulawesi nightjar (Caprimulgus celebensis) is a species of nightjar in the family Caprimulgidae. It is endemic to Indonesia, where it occurs on Sulawesi and the Sula Islands. Its natural habitats are subtropical or tropical moist lowland forests and subtropical or tropical mangrove forests.

References

Endemic birds of Sulawesi
Caprimulgus
Birds described in 1894
Taxonomy articles created by Polbot